In theoretical computer science a bisimulation is a binary relation between state transition systems, associating systems that behave in the same way in that one system simulates the other and vice versa.

Intuitively two systems are bisimilar if they, assuming we view them as playing a game according to some rules, match each other's moves. In this sense, each of the systems cannot be distinguished from the other by an observer.

Formal definition 
Given a labeled state transition system (→),
where  is a set of states,  is a set of labels and → is a set of labelled transitions (i.e., a subset of ),
a bisimulation is a binary relation ,
such that both  and its converse  are simulations. From this follows that the symmetric closure of a bisimulation is a bisimulation, and that each symmetric simulation is a bisimulation. Thus some authors define bisimulation as a symmetric simulation.

 if , then there is  such that ;
 if , then there is  such that .

This means that the bisimilarity relation  is the union of all bisimulations:  precisely when  for some bisimulation .

The set of bisimulations is closed under union; therefore, the bisimilarity relation is itself a bisimulation. Since it is the union of all bisimulations, it is the unique largest bisimulation. Bisimulations are also closed under reflexive, symmetric, and transitive closure; therefore, the largest bisimulation must be reflexive, symmetric, and transitive. From this follows that the largest bisimulation — bisimilarity — is an equivalence relation.

Alternative definitions

Relational definition 
Bisimulation can be defined in terms of composition of relations as follows.

and

From the monotonicity and continuity of relation composition, it follows immediately that the set of bisimulations is closed under unions (joins in the poset of relations), and a simple algebraic calculation shows that the relation of bisimilarity—the join of all bisimulations—is an equivalence relation. This definition, and the associated treatment of bisimilarity, can be interpreted in any involutive quantale.

Fixpoint definition 

Bisimilarity can also be defined in order-theoretical fashion, in terms of fixpoint theory, more precisely as the greatest fixed point of a certain function defined below.

and

Ehrenfeucht–Fraïssé game definition  
Bisimulation can also be thought of in terms of a game between two players:  attacker and defender.

That is,

or 

The "Defender" must then attempt to match that transition,  from either  or  depending on the attacker's move.
I.e., they must find an   such that:

or 

Attacker and defender continue to take alternating turns until:

 The defender is unable to find any valid transitions to match the attacker's move.  In this case the attacker wins.
 The game reaches states  that are both 'dead' (i.e., there are no transitions from either state) In this case the defender wins
 The game goes on forever, in which case the defender wins.
 The game reaches states , which have already been visited.  This is equivalent to an infinite play and counts as a win for the defender.

By the above definition the system is a bisimulation if and only if there exists a winning strategy for the defender.

Coalgebraic definition 

A bisimulation for state transition systems is a special case of coalgebraic bisimulation for the type of covariant powerset functor.

Let  be -th projection mapping
 the forward image of  defined by dropping the third component

Using the above notations, a relation  is a bisimulation on a transition system  if and only if there exists a transition system  on the relation  such that the diagram

hold

Variants of bisimulation 
In special contexts the notion of bisimulation is sometimes refined by adding additional requirements or constraints. An example is that of stutter bisimulation, in which one transition of one system may be matched with multiple transitions of the other, provided that the intermediate states are equivalent to the starting state ("stutters").

This is closely related to bisimulation up to a relation.

Typically, if the state transition system gives the operational semantics of a programming language, then the precise definition of bisimulation will be specific to the restrictions of the programming language. Therefore, in general, there may be more than one kind of bisimulation, (bisimilarity resp.) relationship depending on the context.

Bisimulation and modal logic 

Since Kripke models are a special case of (labelled) state transition systems, bisimulation is also a topic in modal logic. In fact, modal logic is the fragment of first-order logic invariant under bisimulation (van Benthem's theorem).

Algorithm 
Checking that two finite transition systems are bisimilar can be done in polynomial time. The fastest algorithms are quasilinear time using partition refinement through a reduction to the coarsest partition problem.

See also 
 Simulation preorder
 Congruence relation
 Probabilistic bisimulation

Notes

References

Further reading

External links

Software tools 
 CADP: tools to minimize and compare finite-state systems according to various bisimulations
 mCRL2: tools to minimize and compare finite-state systems according to various bisimulations
 The Bisimulation Game Game

Theoretical computer science
Formal methods
Logic in computer science
Transition systems